Alaa Abdul-Hussein  (born October 7, 1986) is an Iraqi football player who currently plays for Arbil FC in Iraq.

External links

Iraqi footballers
Iraq international footballers
Sportspeople from Basra
Al-Mina'a SC players
Iraqi expatriate footballers
Living people
1986 births
Association football defenders